Sparkasse Am Butzweilerhof is a terminus station on the Cologne Stadtbahn line 5, located in the Cologne district of Ossendorf. The station lies on Von-Hünefeld-Straße, the center of a large media and business park of Coloneum, RTL Television and NetCologne.

Station and the entire neighborhood is named after the former Cologne Butzweilerhof Airport. It was opened on 12. December 2010 and consists of one island platform with two rail tracks.

See also 
 List of Cologne KVB stations

External links 
 station info page 

 

Cologne KVB stations
Ehrenfeld, Cologne
Railway stations in Germany opened in 2010